Availles-sur-Seiche (Gallo: Avaylh) is a commune in the Ille-et-Vilaine department, in Brittany, in northwestern France.

Population

Inhabitants of Availles-sur-Seiche are called Availlais in French.

See also
Communes of the Ille-et-Vilaine department

References

Mayors of Ille-et-Vilaine Association

External links

  

Communes of Ille-et-Vilaine